Thirst is a craving for liquids.

Thirst may also refer to:

Film
 Thirst (1929 film) or Desert Nights, an American silent film starring John Gilbert
 Thirst (1949 film), a Swedish film by Ingmar Bergman
 Pyaasa or Thirst, a 1957 Indian film by Guru Dutt
 Thirst (1959 film), a Soviet film
 Thirst (1960 film), an Argentine-Spanish film
 Thirst (1961 film), a Romanian film
 Thirst (1979 film), an Australian film by Rod Hardy
 Thirst, a 1998 American television film directed by Bill L. Norton
 Thirst (2004 film), an Israeli-Palestinian film
 The Thirst (film), a 2006 horror film directed by Jeremy Kasten
 Thirst (2009 film), a Korean film by Park Chan-wook
 Thirst (2010 film), a Canadian film starring Lacey Chabert
 Thirst (2012 film), an Australian film
 Thirst (2019 film), an Icelandic film

Music
 The Thirst (band), a British rock band
 Thirst (Clock DVA album), 1981
 Thirst (Randy Stonehill album), 1998
 Thirst (Tankard album), 2008
 "Thirst", a song by City and Colour from The Hurry and the Harm

Television
 "Thirst" (NCIS), an episode
 "Thirst" (Smallville), an episode
 "Thirst" (Transformers: Prime), an episode

Other uses
 The Thirst (novel), a 2017 novel by Jo Nesbø
 Thirst, a 1913 play by Eugene O'Neill
 The Thirst, in comics, an enemy of Aquaman
 Thirst Project, a nonprofit organization
 A clipping of thirst trap

See also
 Thirsty (disambiguation)